Kotys is a surname. Notable people with the surname include:

Joe Kotys (1925–2012), American artistic gymnast
Nick Kotys (1913–2005), American football coach
Ryszard Kotys (1932–2021), Polish actor

See also